Al-Muwaqqar is a district in the Amman Governorate of north-western Jordan. The village contains the scant ruins of an Umayyad palace, the Qasr al-Muwaqqar, one of the desert castles. Little remains of the palace today except several acanthus leaf capitals and gauge of a water reservoir.

The district is the headquarters of the 3rd Armored Division and a police training center. 
Most of the families which are staying in the region are from Bani Sakhr, like Al-Khraisha, Al-Arabid, Al-Jbour, Al-Qudahh.

Archaeology: Qasr al-Muwaqqar
The village of contains the ruins of an Umayyad complex, the Qasr al-Muwaqqar, a qasr-type fortified palace also known as a desert castle. Almost nothing remains of the palace today except several acanthus-leaf capitals and a water level gauge for a palace cistern, inscribed with Kufic signs which indicate a maximum level of over thirty feet (c. 10 metres), very impressive for the arid climate of the area.

Two distinct qusur, Muwaqqar and Mushash
Despite some name confusion, which combined the two names into one, the following are two distinct Umayyad sites which contain qusur (plural of qasr): al-Muwaqqar and Qasr al-Mushash. They lay 19.4 km apart on the historical caravan route between Amman and Azraq via Qusayr 'Amra, on which all these localities acted as way stations.

See also
Desert castles
Islamic art
Islamic architecture
Jordanian art
List of castles in Jordan

References

External links
Information and image from Qasr Al Muwaqqar
Photos of al-Muwaqqar at the American Center of Research
Photos of Qasr al-Muwaqqar at the Manar al-Athar photo archive

Populated places in Amman Governorate
Umayyad palaces
Umayyad architecture in Jordan
Districts of Amman